The 1996 Junior Pan American Rhythmic Gymnastics Championships was held in Guatemala City, Guatemala, December 5–8, 1996.

Medal summary

References

1996 in gymnastics
Pan American Gymnastics Championships
International gymnastics competitions hosted by Guatemala